Badjaling is a small town in the Wheatbelt region of Western Australia located close to the Salt River, and is approximately  west of Perth.

History
The townsite was originally declared as Yuruga in 1914 but the name was changed to Badjaling later the same year. The word Badjalling is the Aboriginal name for the nearby soak and springs. Badjal means the feathers discarded as a bird is plucked.

In 1932, the Wheat Pool of Western Australia announced that the town would have two grain elevators, each fitted with an engine, installed at the railway siding.

The railway siding was the usual location of departure for the annual Stacey lamb train carrying several thousand lambs raised by L J Stacy of Quairading to Robbs Jetty Abattoir.

Geography
The Pink Lake of Quairading is actually at Badjaling, with the main road, Bruce Rock–Quairading Road, crossing it.

See also
 Badjaling Nature Reserve

References 

Shire of Quairading